Woodsist is an American independent record label founded in 2006 by Jeremy Earl of the band Woods and based in Stone Ridge, New York.

Artists

 Alex Bleeker and the Freaks
 Art Museums
 The Babies
 Blank Dogs
 Blues Control
 The Christian Family Underground
 Cian Nugent
 Crystal Stilts
 The Doozer
 Ducktails
 Eat Skull
 Excepter
 Fergus & Geronimo
 The Folk Spectre
 The Fresh & Onlys
 Ganglians
 Golden Calves
 Hand Habits
 Herbcraft
 Idle Times
 Jana Hunter
 John Andrews & the Yawns
 Jonathan Rado
 Kevin Morby
 Kurt Vile
 Little Wings
 Loosers
 Mac Demarco
 Magic Lantern
 Matt Kivel
 Matt "MV" Valentine
 The Mayfair Set
 Meneguar
 Meth Teeth
 Moon Duo
 MV & EE
 Night Wounds
 Nodzzz
 Pink Reason
 Pocahaunted
 Psychedelic Horseshit
 Purling Hiss
 Raccoo-oo-oon
 Real Estate
 Robedoor
 Royal Baths
 Sic Alps
 Simon Joyner
 Skygreen Leopards
 Spectre Folk
 Sun Araw
 Thee Oh Sees
 Vivian Girls
 Wavves
 White Fence
 Wooden Wand
 Woods
 The Woolen Men

Discography

 Woodsist 001 Raccoo-oo-oon – Mythos Folkways No. 1 (LP) 2006 
 Woodsist 002 Night Wounds – Allergic to Heat (LP) 2006 
 Woodsist 003 Blues Control – Puff (LP) 2007 
 Woodsist 004 Woods – At Rear House (LP) 2007 
 Woodsist 005 Wooden Wand – More from the Mountain (7") 2007  
 Woodsist 006 Raccoo-oo-oon – Mythos Folkways Vol. III (LP) 2007 
 Woodsist 007 Jana Hunter – Carrion (S/Sided 12") 2007 
 Woodsist 008 The Christian Family Underground – For the Depth of Your Union... (LP) 2007 
 Woodsist 009 The Folk Spectre – The Blackest Medicine (LP) 2007 
 Woodsist 010 Loosers – Logic on Its Head (10") 2007 
 Woodsist 011 Sic Alps – Strawberry Guillotine (7") 2007
 Woodsist 012 Pocahaunted – Peyote Road (LP) 2008 
 Woodsist 013 Meneguar – The In Hour (CD/LP)
 Woodsist 014 Pink Reason – Winona (7") 2008 
 Woodsist 015 Robedoor – Endlessly Blazing (LP) 2008 
 Woodsist 016 Vivian Girls – Tell the World (7") 2008 
 Woodsist 017 Crystal Stilts – Crystal Stilts (CD/12") 2008 
 woodsist 018 Sun Araw – Boat Trip (12") 2008 
 Woodsist 019 Magic Lantern – Magic Lantern (12") 2008 
 Woodsist 020 Idle Times – Idle Times (7") 2008 
 Woodsist 021 Blank Dogs – The Fields (CD/LP) 2008 
 Woodsist 022 Wavves – Wavves (CD/LP) 2008 
 Woodsist 023 Psychedelic Horseshit – Shitgaze Anthems (LP) 2009 
 Woodsist 024 Kurt Vile – Constant Hitmaker (CD/LP) 2009 
 Woodsist 025 Woods – Songs of Shame (CD/LP) 2009 
 Woodsist 026 Thee Oh Sees – Tidal Wave (7") 2009 
 Woodsist 027 Fergus & Geronimo – Harder than It's Ever Been/Last Letter (7") 2009 
 Woodsist 028 Ganglians – Ganglians (12") 2009 
 Woodsist 029 Real Estate – Fake Blues (7") 2009 
 Woodsist 030 Meth Teeth – Everything Went Wrong (LP) 2009 
 Woodsist 031 Ganglians – Monster Head Room (CD) 2009
 Woodsist 032 The Fresh & Onlys – Grey-Eyed Girls (CD/LP) 2009 
 Woodsist 033 The Mayfair Set – Young One (CD) 2009
 Woodsist 034 Real Estate – Real Estate (CD/LP) 2009
 Woodsist 035 The Fresh & Onlys – "The Second One to Know" 7"
 Woodsist 036 Eat Skull – "Jerusalem Mall" 7"
 Woodsist 037 Art Museums – "Rough Frame" (CD/LP)
 Woodsist 038 Moon Duo – "Escape" Mini-LP/CD
 Woodsist 039 MV & EE – "Home Comfort" LP
 Woodsist 040 Woods – "At Echo Lake" (CD/LP/CS)
 Woodsist 041 Woods – "I Was Gone" 7"
 Woodsist 042 White Fence – S/T (CD)
 Woodsist 043 V/A – Welcome Home/Diggin' the Universe (LP/CS)
 Woodsist 044 Royal Baths – CD/LP
 Woodsist 045 Sun Araw – Off Duty 12"/ CD (includes Boat Trip EP)
 Woodsist 046 Excepter – "Late" 12"
 Woodsist 047 Purling Hiss – Public Service Announcement LP
 Woodsist 048 Ducktails – III: Arcade Dynamics CD/LP
 Woodsist 049 White Fence – Is Growing Faith  CD/LP
 Woodsist 050 Spectre Folk – The Blackest Medicine, Vol. II- 12"
 Woodsist 051 Nodzzz - "Innings" – (CD/LP) 2011
 Woodsist 052 Matt "MV" Valentine – "What I Became" (LP) 2011
 Woodsist 053 Woods – "Sun and Shade" (CD/LP) 2011
 Woodsist 054 Woods / Kurt Vile – Split (7") 2011
 Woodsist 055 The Doozer – Keep It Together (LP) 2012
 Woodsist 056 Golden Calves – Collection: Money Band + Century Band  (2xLP) 2012
 Woodsist 057 White Fence – Family Perfume vol. 1 (LP) 2012
 Woodsist 058 White Fence – Family Perfume vol. 2 (LP) 2012
 Woodsist 059 White Fence – Family Perfume vol. 1&2 (CD/CS/2xLP) 2012 
 Woodsist 060 MV & EE – Space Homestead (CD/LP) 2012
 Woodsist 061 Woods – "Cali in a Cup" (7") 2012
 Woodsist 062 Woods – "Bend Beyond" (CD/LP/CS) 2012
 Woodsist 063 The Babies – "Moonlight Mile" (7") 2012
 Woodsist 064 The Babies – "Our House on the Hill" (CD/LP/CS) 2012
 Woodsist 065 Eat Skull – "III" (LP) 2013
 Woodsist 066 Herbcraft – "The Astral Body Electric" (LP) 2013
 Woodsist 067 The Woolen Men – "S/T" (LP) 2013
 Woodsist 068 Alex Bleeker and the Freaks – "How Far Away" (CD/LP) 2013
 Woodsist 069 Woods – "Be All Be Easy" (7") 2013
 Woodsist 070 Jonathan Rado – "Law and Order" (CD/LP) 2013
 Woodsist 071 Kevin Morby – "Harlem River" (CD/LP) 2013
 Woodsist 072 Woods – "With Light and with Love" (CD/LP/CS) 2014
 Woodsist 073 Skygreen Leopards – "Family Crimes" (CD/LP) 2014
 Woodsist 074 Matt Kivel – "Days of Being Wild" (CD/LP) 2014
 Woodsist 075 Kevin Morby – "Still Life" (CD/LP) 2014
 Woodsist 076 Simon Joyner – "Grass, Branch & Bone" (LP) 2015
 Woodsist 077 Little Wings – "Explains" (CD/LP) 2015
 Woodsist 078 John Andrews & the Yawns – "Bit by the Fang" (LP) 2015
 Woodsist 079 The Babies – "Our House on the Hill Outtakes" 2015
 Woodsist 080 Herbcraft – "Wot Oz" (LP) 2015
 Woodsist 081 Little Wings – "Live in Big Sur" (CS) 2015
 Woodsist 082 The Woolen Men – "Temporary Monument" (LP) 2015
 Woodsist 083 Cian Nugent – "Night Fiction" (LP) 2016

See also
List of record labels

References

External links
Woodsist official website

American record labels
Record labels established in 2006
Companies based in Orange County, New York